Doug McKenzie may refer to:

Comedians
 Part of the Canadian comedy duo Bob and Doug McKenzie
 Part of the Australian comedy duo Zig and Zag (Australian performers)

Others
Doug McKenzie (magician) (born 1980), magician and TV producer
Douglas McKenzie (1906–1979), Australian cricketer

See also
Doug MacKenzie (disambiguation)